Mr. Micheal is a 1980 Indian Malayalam film,  directed by J. Williams. The film stars Prem Nazir, Jose, Sreelatha Namboothiri and Zarina Wahab in the lead roles. The film has musical score by Chakravarthy.

Cast
Prem Nazir as Michael 
Jose as Johny 
Sreelatha Namboothiri as Rinku 
Zarina Wahab as Lilly
Kuthiravattam Pappu as Pappu
Seema as Shubha
Cochin Haneefa as SP Nair
Balan K Nair as Guru Aasan
Sathaar as Sub Inspector 
Prathapachandran as Shuba's Uncle
Ceylon Manohar as Manohar

Soundtrack
The music was composed by Chakravarthy and the lyrics were written by yusafali & Bichu Thirumala.

References

External links
 

1980 films
1980s Malayalam-language films